The 1963 U.S. Women's Open was the 18th U.S. Women's Open, held July 18–20
at Kenwood Country Club, northeast of Cincinnati, Ohio.

Mary Mills, age 23, won her only U.S. Women's Open title, three strokes ahead of runners-up Louise Suggs and Sandra Haynie. It was the first of nine victories on the LPGA Tour for Mills and the first of her three major titles.

Retired tennis pro Althea Gibson, age 35, became the first African American to play in a U.S. Women's Open. She shot 78 and 82 for 160 (+14) and missed the cut by a stroke. Three-time champion Mickey Wright did not play, opting for dental work, which she had originally planned to have done the previous week. Wright returned in 1964 to win her fourth title. Defending champion Murle Lindstrom tied for seventh.

The championship was played the same week as the PGA Championship, which concluded on Sunday.

Past champions in the field

Source:

 Mickey Wright (1958, 1959, 1961) did not compete.

Final leaderboard
Saturday, July 20, 1963

Source:

References

External links
Golf Observer final leaderboard
U.S. Women's Open Golf Championship
U.S. Women's Open – past champions – 1963
Kenwood Country Club

U.S. Women's Open
Golf in Ohio
Sports competitions in Ohio
History of Cincinnati
Women's sports in Ohio
U.S. Women's Open
U.S. Women's Open
U.S. Women's Open